Rakovica is a village and a municipality in south-central Croatia, in the region of Kordun south of Karlovac and Slunj, and north of the Plitvice Lakes. Rakovica is an underdeveloped municipality which is statistically classified as the First Category Area of Special State Concern by the Government of Croatia.

History
Rakovica achieved some prominence in Croatian history in October 1871, when several members of the Croatian Party of Rights led by Eugen Kvaternik disavowed the official party position advocating a political solution to the issue of Croatia within the Habsburg monarchy and instead launched a revolt in the village.

Demographics
The total municipality population is 2,387 (2011), while the village itself has 310 residents. According to that census, 94.8% (2,262) are Croats and 3.2% (77) are ethnic Serbs.

Settlements
According to the 2011 census, the municipality or Rakovica consists of the following settlements:

 Basara, population 4
 Brajdić Selo, population 79
 Brezovac, population 8
 Broćanac, population 25
 Čatrnja, population 228
 Ćuić Brdo, population 1
 Drage, population 17
 Drežnik Grad, population 323
 Gornja Močila, population 4
 Grabovac, population 338
 Irinovac, population 137
 Jamarje, population 0
 Jelov Klanac, population 79
 Koranski Lug, population 0
 Kordunski Ljeskovac, population 9
 Korita, population 46
 Lipovac, population 15
 Lipovača, population 133
 Mašvina, population 5
 Nova Kršlja, population 70
 Oštarski Stanovi, population 132
 Rakovica, population 246
 Rakovičko Selište, population 88
 Sadilovac, population 1
 Selište Drežničko, population 290
 Stara Kršlja, population 6

Sights
Due to proximity of Plitvice Lakes, one of the main fields of income is tourism. One of its sights are the Caves of Barać which were reopened for visitors in 2004.

See also
Rakovica Revolt
Caves of Barać

References

External links
  

Municipalities of Croatia
Populated places in Karlovac County